Usha Mittal Institute of Technology (UMIT) is an engineering college in Mumbai affiliated to SNDT Women's University. It was formerly known as the Institute of Technology for Women (ITW). The institute is directly managed by the SNDT Women's University and is approved by the All India Council of Technical Education (AICTE) and the University Grants Commission (UGC).

UMIT has over 800 students and 50 faculty. It is the only all-women engineering institute in Mumbai.

History
SNDT established the Institute of Technology for Women in 1997. The institute offered a four-year bachelor's degree course in Computer Science and Technology, Electronics and Communications and Information Technology.

After a generous donation from the Lakshmi Niwas Mittal Foundation, the institute was renamed Usha Mittal Institute of Technology.

Committees
UMIT has student chapters of a number of organisations:
IEEE, Computer Society of India (CSI), 
Association for Computing Machinery (ACM) and
E-Elite, National Entrepreneurship Network (NEN). The college has a National Service Scheme (NSS) unit. Recently, in 2019, UMIT started another chapter known as the Google Developer student club (GDSC) which is powered by Google. UMIT is one of the few colleges to have this club. 

UMIT also has Sports Council which conducts 'Xuberance week' as their main event and conducts many sports related fun events to encourage students to maintain their physical fitness.

The college holds an annual cultural festival, 'Arcane Illusions'. The councils also hold festivals: CSI organizes the technical festival 'Abhivyakti' while IEEE organizes '360 Degrees'.

In 2009, UMIT hosted the national-level conference-cum-technical festival 'Tech Tornado', organised by the ACM Students chapter. The chapter sponsor is Dr. T.J. Mathew. The 2009 trophy was won by PSG Coimbatore.

References

External links
 Official website

Educational institutions established in 1997
Engineering colleges in Mumbai
All India Council for Technical Education
Women's engineering colleges in India
Women's universities and colleges in Maharashtra
1997 establishments in Maharashtra